Andie Airfix (27 August 1946 – 10 October 2018) was a British graphic designer who created album covers for Black Sabbath, Def Leppard, Judas Priest, Metallica, Philip Lynott, the Rolling Stones, Guns N' Roses, Paul McCartney and Thompson Twins, among many others under his own company Satori.

Andie Airfix catalogued his graphic design experience in his blog “B*b G*ld*ph stole my sunglasses? A Guide to Graphic design as an extreme sport”.

Airfix died after a short illness  on 10 October 2018 at the age of 72. Airfix's death was announced on 17 October via his social media accounts. His cause of death has not been revealed.

References

1946 births
2018 deaths
British graphic designers